Ryan Merkley was the Chief of Staff to the office of the Executive Director of the Wikimedia Foundation, and former CEO of the American non-profit organization Creative Commons. He is an advocate for open licenses, net neutrality and open data initiatives in the public sector. Merkley is the Chair of the Open Worm Foundation board of directors and was trustee at the Quetico Foundation. He writes and speaks on issues such as the sharing economy, academic publishing and legal infrastructure for sharing content.

In 2016, he was listed in the Globe and Mail's "Sixteen Torontonians to Watch in 2016".

Biography
Merkley was born in Cambridge, Ontario, and studied at the University of Waterloo from 1998 to 2001, and employed at Engineers Without Borders Canada as the Chief Communications Officer. He worked for the City of Toronto government and the City of Vancouver government in roles such as Director of Communications and Senior Advisor to the Office of the Mayor, leading the open government data initiative of Toronto mayor David Miller. In 2010, he moved to the Mozilla Foundation to take the role of Director of Programs and Strategy. During his tenure at Mozilla, he contributed to the development of products in support of the open web including Lightbeam, Webmaker, and Popcorn.

Creative Commons 
Merkley was recruited as CEO for Creative Commons in 2014, after the position was vacated by Catherine Casserly in 2013. His focus included work on new, long-term strategy and sustainability of the Creative Commons mission and operations. His 2016 op-ed in Wired criticising the academic publishing industry was referenced by then-Vice President of the United States Joe Biden in his speech to the American Association for Cancer Research, calling for more open research. In 2016, he successfully secured a  grant from The William and Flora Hewlett Foundation to support Creative Commons' new strategy, re-focusing the organisation on encouraging sharing.

On February 7, 2017, Merkley announced a partnership between Creative Commons, Wikimedia Foundation and The Metropolitan Museum of Art where the museum released 375,000 images under a public domain dedication Creative Commons Zero, known as CC0.  As part of the announcement, Creative Commons also released the beta of CC Search which included social features for list sharing and simple attribution. The search engine, currently in BETA, pulls Creative Commons licensed images from The MET, Flickr, 500px, Rijksmuseum, and the New York Public Library.

References

External links
 
 
 

Living people
Open content activists
People from Cambridge, Ontario
Wikimedia Foundation staff members
Year of birth missing (living people)
University of Waterloo alumni